Begić is a surname derived from the Turkish honorific title bey (known as beg in Serbro-Croatian). It may refer to:

Aida Begić (born 1976), Bosnian film director and screenwriter
Ana-Marija Begić (born 1994), Croatian basketball player
Denis Begic (born 1970), Swedish politician
Elvedin Begić (born 1961), Bosnian football official
Mirza Begić (born 1985) Bosnian-Slovenian professional basketball player
Senad Begić (born 1969), Bosnian footballer
Silvije Begić (born 1993), Croatian footballer
Tjaš Begić (born 2003), Slovenian footballer
Vera Begić (b. 1982) Croatian field events athlete
Vilko Begić (1874–1946) Croatian military officer

See also
Beg (disambiguation)
Begich (disambiguation)
Baig
Bey
Mirza

Bosnian surnames
Croatian surnames